Francesco Maria Emanuele Gaetani (1720–1802), marquis of Villabianca, was a Sicilian nobleman and historian.

Life 

Gaetani was born in Palermo, and held public office there. He was senator of the city in 1775–76. He studied and wrote about the history of Sicily. He died in Palermo in 1802.

Publications 

His principal publication was Della Sicilia Nobile, published in five parts between 1754 and 1775, the last part of the appendix published posthumously in 1897.

 Della Sicilia Nobile (1754-1775). Palermo: Stamperia dei Santi Apostoli per Pietro Bencivenga
 Part 1 (1754) archive.org 
Introduction, pp.I-XXIV 
Book 1, General Description of Sicily, pp.1-70 
Book 2, Magistrates of the Kingdom, pp.71-100 
Book 3, Kings of Sicily, pp.101-230 
Book 4, Presidents of the Three Supreme Tribunals with Judges, pp.231-258 
Index to Part 1, pp.259-292  
 Part 2 (1754), pp.1- books.google.com archive.org 
Introduction to the Baronage of the Kingdom, pp.3-12 
Book 1, Baronage of the Kingdom - Princes, pp.13-210 
Index of Fiefdoms, pp.211-212 
Index of Families, pp.213-216 
 Continuation of Part 2 (1757) books.google.com 
 Part 3 (1759) books.google.com 
 Appendix, Volume 1 (1775) books.google.com 
 Appendix (1897), published by Carlo Crispo Moncada and Antonino Mango, Palermo: O. Fiorenza.

Among his other works are:
 
 Notizie storiche intorno agli antichi sette uffizi del Regno di Sicilia, published in two parts in: Opuscoli di Autori Siciliani, Palermo: Stamperia dei Santi Apostoli
 Part I, in volume VIII (1764)
 Part II, in volume XI (1770)
 Catalogo di tutti i parti letterarj editi, ed inediti specialmente intorno a storia sicola-palermitana, Palermo: Stamperia di d. Rosario Abbate in Piazza Bologni (1791)

His Diari della Città di Palermo, annals from 1743 to 1802, were published posthumously, as were his 48 Opuscoli palermitani on local topics.

References

1720 births
1802 deaths
18th-century Italian historians
Nobility from Palermo
Burials at San Domenico, Palermo
Writers from Palermo
Historians of Sicily